The GFF National Women's League, often referred to as GFF Always National Women's League for sponsor reasons, is the top level of the women's football system in Guyana. Contested by 6 clubs. The competition was formed in 2018 as a 7 versus 7 competition, from the 2019-20 the season is 11 versus 11. Matches in the competition take 70 minutes (2 times 35 minutes).

Teams
 Foxy Ladies (Den Amstel)
 Panthers (Georgetown)
 Conquerors (Georgetown)
 Guyana Defence Force (Georgetown)
 Guyana Police Force (Georgetown)
 Santos (Georgetown)

Champions
2019-20: Conquerors

References

External links
Federation Site
Guyana (women) 2019/20 RSSSF

Football in Guyana